Emilian Patrick Polino (born 11 May 1981) is a boxer from Tanzania who qualified for the 2008 Olympics at bantamweight.

Career
In 2002 and 2006 the civil servant from Dar es Salaam competed in the Commonwealth Games but exited in the first round. 
At the first Olympic qualifier he again lost in the  first round, at the second he was defeated by veteran Bruno Julie but grabbed the last remaining berth by edging Ugandan Aldina Muzei 6:5. Ultimately, Polino did not compete in Beijing, however.

External links
2nd Olympic qualifier
Data

Living people
People from Dar es Salaam
Bantamweight boxers
1981 births
Tanzanian male boxers
Boxers at the 2002 Commonwealth Games
Boxers at the 2006 Commonwealth Games
Commonwealth Games competitors for Tanzania